The Danville Southern Pacific Train Depot in Danville, California is located at 205 Railroad Ave. and W Prospect Ave. It was built in 1891 on land donated by John Hartz which was erected when the Martinez line was extended south to San Ramon. The first train came on June 7, 1891. Passenger service ended in 1934. The Southern Pacific Railroad trains continued to pass through town with freight until 1978 when the line was abandoned. The building was sold in 1951 for the Danville Supply and Feed store. In June 1996, it was purchased and moved 100 yards. 

It was a passenger and freight station built to the design titled "Combination Station No. 22" out of standard designs of the Southern Pacific.

In 2018 it houses the Museum of the San Ramon Valley.  It lies along the Iron Horse Regional Trail, a rail trail formed from the converted Southern Pacific right of way.

See also 
 National Register of Historic Places listings in Contra Costa County, California

References

External links 

 Southern Pacific Railroad Depot
 Museum of the San Ramon Valley

Danville, California
Railway stations in Contra Costa County, California
National Register of Historic Places in Contra Costa County, California
Railway stations on the National Register of Historic Places in California
Historic districts on the National Register of Historic Places in California
Stick-Eastlake architecture in California
Former Southern Pacific Railroad stations in California
Railway stations in the United States opened in 1891
Railway stations closed in 1934